The 1922 Pacific Tigers football team represented the College of the Pacific—now known as the University of the Pacific—in Stockton, California as a member of the California Coast Conference (CCC) during the 1922 college football season. The team was led by second-year head coach Erwin Righter and played home games at a field on campus in Stockton. Pacific compiled an overall record of 6–1 with a mark of 3–0 in conference playing, winning the CCC North division in the conference's inaugural season. The Tigers dominated their opponents, outscoring them 105–19 for the season and had five shutouts in the seven games. At the end of the season, Pacific met the champion of the CCC South Division, Fresno State, for the conference championship. The game was played in Fresno, California and resulted in the only blemish on the Pacific schedule, a 12–7 loss.

Schedule

References

Pacific
Pacific Tigers football seasons
Pacific Tigers football